Melitaea chitralensis is a butterfly of the family Nymphalidae. It is found in Kashmir and Chitral.

References

Butterflies described in 1901
Melitaea